Khandakar Mofizur Rahman is a politician and the former Member of Parliament of Kishoreganj-6.

Career
Rahman was elected to parliament from Kishoreganj-6 as a Combined opposition candidate in 1988.

Death
Rahman died on 28 March 2018.

References

1948 births
2018 deaths
4th Jatiya Sangsad members